Kenneth Dehn Mikkelsen (born 12 August 1971 in Holstebro) is a Danish politician, who is a member of the Folketing for the Venstre political party. He entered parliament on 1 April 2021 after Kristian Jensen resigned his seat.

Political career
Mikkelsen ran for parliament in the 2019 Danish general election, and received 4,659 votes. He was not elected into parliament in the election, but became Venstre's primary substitute in the West Jutland constituency. When Kristian Jensen resigned his seat on 1 April 2021, Mikkelsen replaced him in parliament and took over the seat.

References

External links 
 Biography on the website of the Danish Parliament (Folketinget)

1971 births
Living people
People from Holstebro
Venstre (Denmark) politicians
Members of the Folketing 2019–2022